|}

The Ballybrit Novice Chase is a Grade 3 National Hunt chase in Ireland which is open to horses aged four years or older. The race is run at Galway Racecourse, over a distance of 2 miles and 1 furlong (3,419 metres).

The race was run in early September from 2014 to 2016, having been moved from its previous date at the end of October as part of the changes made to the Irish Pattern for 2014/15. Since 2017 it has been run in August.

The race was first run in 1997 and was awarded Grade 3 status in 2002.

Records
Most successful jockey (4 wins):
 David Casey – Drunken Disorderly (2007), Holly Tree (2008), Head Of The Posse (2010), Sweeps Hill (2011)
 Paul Townend -  Alelchi Inois (2014), Rathvinden (2017), Wicklow Brave (2019), Fan De Blues (2021)

Most successful trainer (5 wins): 
 Willie Mullins – Twinlight (2012), 	Alelchi Inois (2014), Rathvinden (2017), 	Wicklow Brave (2019), Fan De Blues (2021)

Winners

See also
 Horse racing in Ireland
 List of Irish National Hunt races

References

Racing Post:
, 

National Hunt chases
National Hunt races in Ireland
Ballybrit Racecourse